is a company that develops its business centered on technical, chemical, and medical worker dispatching businesses as well as electric vehicles. It is well known for the development of the all-electric sports car Aspark Owl.

History
Aspark was founded in October 2005 by Japanese businessman Masanori Yoshida in Osaka. In the following years, the company focused on offering engineering services for the automotive industry, as well as for the heavy industry and the electronics industry. By May 2019, Aspark had grown to 25 offices worldwide, employing 3,500 people and generating a turnover of US$160 million.

In the middle of the second decade of the 21st century, Aspark began work on an electric supercar, aimed at offering record performance (less than 2 seconds to ) with the possibility of moving the vehicle in traffic. After the presentation of the pre-production prototype at the 2017 Frankfurt Motor Show, the official premiere of the serial Aspark Owl took place in November 2019 during the Dubai International Motor Show.

Production of Owl began on behalf of the Japanese company by the Italian partner Manifattura Automobili Torino began in Turin in 2020. The manufacturer describes Owl as the fastest-accelerating car in the world.

Vehicles
Aspark Owl

References

External links 

Car manufacturers of Japan
Manufacturing companies based in Osaka
Electric vehicle manufacturers of Japan
Japanese brands
Japanese companies established in 2005
Vehicle manufacturing companies established in 2005
Car brands